The 1922 Argentine Primera División was the 31st season of top-flight football in Argentina. Huracán win its second consecutive championship, while Independiente obtained its first title, the Asociación Amateurs de Football championship.

Final tables

Asociación Argentina de Football - Copa Campeonato

Alvear, Boca Alumni, San Fernando and Progresista made their debuts at the top division of Argentine football.

Asociación Amateurs de Football

References

Argentine Primera División seasons
1922 in Argentine football
1922 in South American football